German submarine U-33 was a Type VIIA U-boat of Nazi Germany's Kriegsmarine during World War II.

Her keel was laid down on 1 September 1935 at the Germaniawerft in Kiel. She was launched on 11 June 1936 and commissioned on 25 July with Ottoheinrich Junker in command. He was relieved by Kurt Freiwald on 22 November. Kapitänleutnant (Kptlt.) Hans-Wilhelm von Dresky took over on 29 October 1938 and commanded the boat until her loss.

Rotors from Kriegsmarines Enigma machine were captured from the survivors, the wiring of which was unknown at that time to British codebreakers at Bletchley Park.

Design
As one of the first ten German Type VII submarines later designated as Type VIIA submarines, U-33 had a displacement of  when at the surface and  while submerged. She had two shafts and two  propellers.

U-33 was fitted with five  torpedo tubes (four fitted at the bow and one at the stern), eleven torpedoes, one  SK C/35 naval gun, 220 rounds, and an anti-aircraft gun. The boat had a complement of between forty-four and sixty.

Service history

U-33 took part in Operation Ursula — the German submarine operation in support of Franco's naval forces during the Spanish Civil War from November 1936.

On Monday, 20 November 1939 she sank three British steam trawlers. At 10:30 am, Thomas Hankins 14 miles north-west of Tory Island; at 4:00 pm, Delphine 18 miles north-northeast of Tory and at 5:05 pm Sea Sweeper 25 miles west-northwest of Tory. The crew of Thomas Hankins, under the master, M. Hankins, was rescued by another trawler ten hours later and landed in Northern Ireland. They reported that they had been shelled without warning. The second shell went through the bows and the fifth through the boiler, causing the trawler to sink in about 25 minutes.

On Tuesday, 21 November 1939 at 08:30 in rough seas, the trawler FD87 Sulby (from Fleetwood), was sunk by gunfire from U-33 75–80 miles north-west of Rathlin Island. The crew had just managed to launch and push off the two lifeboats as the submarine fired two shells into the trawler amidships and she sank within two minutes. The U-boat commander pointed at the crew as they rowed from their ship and laughed. One of the lifeboats, whose occupants were Harold Blackburn, James Hay, James William Geddes (of Buckie, Banffshire, Scotland), Fred Brunt, Augustus Lewis, Sydney Mellish and Jack Threlfall were picked up the following day by the Tobermory lifeboat. The other lifeboat was lost with five men including the Skipper, Clarence Hudson; Mate John Michael (Jack) Dawson; and deck hands Raymond Randles, James Wood and R.A. Lister.

An hour or so later at the same location, U-33 sank another trawler, William Humphries. The entire crew of 13 men were lost. Two of them were buried in the graveyard of Cill Chriosd on the Isle of Skye.

Fate
In February 1940, U-33, then captained by Hans-Wilhelm von Dresky, had been ordered to lay mines in the Firth of Clyde, in Scotland. However, the minesweeper , captained by Lieutenant-Commander Hugh Price, detected the U-boat on the 12th and dropped depth charges over a period of several hours.  Eventually, the damaged U-33 was forced to surface and the crew abandoned the boat, which sank soon afterward. 25 men died while 17 survived. Before the boat was abandoned, the U-boat's secret Enigma rotors were distributed amongst a few of the crew, who were instructed to release them into the sea to avoid capture.  This was not done, however, and as a result the British captured three rotors, including two (VI and VII), that were only used by the Kriegsmarine and for which the wiring was previously unknown.

Summary of raiding history

References

Bibliography

 David Kahn, Seizing the Enigma, 1991, pp. 104–112.

 Hugh Sebag-Montefiore, Enigma: The Battle for the Code, 2000, pp. 67–77, 
 Sulby sinking information from Statements to the Secretary of the Fleetwood Steam Trawlers Association Limited and a newspaper cutting from the time.

External links
The sinking of U-33
The Bosun's Watch - Sulby

1936 ships
German Type VIIA submarines
Military units and formations of Nazi Germany in the Spanish Civil War
Ships built in Kiel
U-boats commissioned in 1936
U-boats sunk by depth charges
U-boats sunk in 1940
U-boats sunk by British warships
World War II shipwrecks in the Atlantic Ocean
World War II submarines of Germany
Maritime incidents in February 1940